Peregrine: American Immigration in the 21st Century is an online journal published by the Hoover Institution as part of its Conte Initiative on Immigration Reform. It is focused on understanding immigration to the United States and identifying optimal immigration policy for the contemporary United States. The journal is edited by economist Tim Kane and relies on contributions from Hoover's Working Group on Immigration Reform, co-chaired by Kane and Edward Lazear.

History

The first issue of Peregrine, issue 1401, was published in late June 2014.

Reception

The news release by the Hoover Institution about the launch was published on CNBC, and Herald Online

References

External links

 

Hoover Institution
Immigration to the United States
International relations journals
Publications established in 2014
Bimonthly journals
English-language journals
Stanford University publications
2014 establishments in California